Hlavče Njive is a small settlement in the hills above the Poljane Sora Valley in the Municipality of Gorenja Vas–Poljane in the Upper Carniola region of Slovenia.

Name
Hlavče Njive was attested in historical sources as Qualtsemb in 1291 and Chlapscheniue in 1500.

References

External links 

Hlavče Njive on Geopedia

Populated places in the Municipality of Gorenja vas-Poljane